Cocculina leptalea is a species of sea snail, deep-sea limpet, a marine gastropod mollusk in the family Cocculinidae.

Description

Distribution
 Range: 38.88°N to 28°N; 80°W to 69.14°W.
 USA: New Jersey, North Carolina, Florida; Florida: East Florida
 Gulf of Maine
 North West Atlantic

References

Cocculinidae
Gastropods described in 1884